Wilhelm Grundmann was a German wrestler. He competed in the men's Greco-Roman middleweight at the 1908 Summer Olympics. Grundmann was the only German wrestler competing at the games. He was eliminated in the first round by Dutch Jaap Belmer, and competed for Sportclub Heros 03 Berlin. He ended the tournament tied for 17th place, and came in at an official weight of 161lbs (73kg).

References

External links
 

Year of birth missing
Year of death missing
German male sport wrestlers
Olympic wrestlers of Germany
Wrestlers at the 1908 Summer Olympics
Place of birth missing